Delfine Persoon (born 14 January 1985) is a Belgian professional boxer. She held the IBF female lightweight title in 2012 and the WBC female lightweight title from 2014 to June 2019, losing the title in a unification fight against Katie Taylor for the undisputed lightweight championship. As of September 2020, she is ranked as the world's best active female super-featherweight by BoxRec, the second best active female lightweight by The Ring, and the second best active female, pound for pound, by BoxRec, fifth by The Ring and seventh by ESPN.

Professional boxing career

Persoon, who works as a railway policewoman, started professional boxing in 2009 - switching to boxing after a career in competitive judo. In March 2011 she became EBU European Champion against Nicole Boss. She successfully defended her title in November 2011 against Myriam Dellal.

In February 2012 Persoon won the WIBF world title with a technical knockout (TKO) against Lucia Morelli. In September 2012 she added the IBF world title with a TKO against Erin McGowan. In January 2013 she successfully defended her WIBF title against Anita Torti. In December 2013 she also gained the WIBA world title.

In March 2013 Persoon won a WBC final eliminator against Kremena Petkova, gaining her the right to challenge Erica Farias for the WBC title. In September 2013 she was stripped of the IBF title for inactivity, having failed to defend it in the intervening year. The vacant title was claimed by Victoria Bustos on 21 September.

In December 2013 she won a unification fight with Lucia Morelli for the WIBF & WBF titles. This victory made her the number 1 lightweight in the world according to BoxRec.

On 20 April 2014 Persoon won the WBC title on points from Farias.

Persoon vs. Taylor

In December 2018 it was revealed that Persoon offered $100,000 to IBF and WBA champion Katie Taylor for a fight. Taylor's manager however stated that Taylor would not even get out of bed for this sum. Eventually, a lightweight unification fight between Persoon and Taylor was set for 1 June 2019, at the Madison Square Garden in New York, on the undercard for the Anthony Joshua vs. Andy Ruiz Jr. heavyweight title fight. In addition to all four sanctioning body's titles being on the line, The Ring magazine belt was also at stake.  Persoon's management labelled Taylor's team "totally disrespectful" and claimed "psychological warfare" after a series of late fight week demands. This included forcing Persoon to switch hotel as Taylor was staying in the same hotel, demanding that she take an additional blood test and prove Persoon has exercise asthma. Taylor won a controversial majority decision to become the undisputed lightweight champion.

Super-featherweight
On 11 November 2019 Persoon won the WBA interim super-featherweight title.

Persoon vs. Taylor II

A rematch with Taylor took place on 22 August 2020 at the Matchroom Sport headquarters in Brentwood, Essex, for the undisputed female lightweight title. Taylor won the rematch.

Professional boxing record

Awards
 Vlaamse Reus in 2014.
 Belgian Sportsman of the year in 2015.

References

External links

1985 births
Living people
People from Hooglede
Sportspeople from West Flanders
Belgian female judoka
Belgian women boxers
Lightweight boxers
World lightweight boxing champions
International Boxing Federation champions
World Boxing Council champions